René Barberis (11 March 1886 – 11 August 1959) was a French screenwriter and film director.

Selected filmography

Director
 Colette the Unwanted (1927)
 The Vein (1928)
 The Unknown Dancer (1929)
 Temptation (1929)
 The Wonderful Day (1929)
 A Hole in the Wall (1930)
 Casanova (1934)
 Ramuntcho (1938)

Screenwriter
 A Lucky Man (1930)

References

Bibliography
 Bentley, Bernard. A Companion to Spanish Cinema. Boydell & Brewer 2008.

External links

1886 births
1959 deaths
French male screenwriters
20th-century French screenwriters
French film directors
People from Nice
20th-century French male writers